The voiceless dental non-sibilant fricative is a type of consonantal sound used in some spoken languages. It is familiar to English speakers as the 'th' in think. Though rather rare as a phoneme among the world's languages, it is encountered in some of the most widespread and influential ones.

The dental non-sibilant fricatives are often called "interdental" because they are often produced with the tongue between the upper and lower teeth, and not just against the back of the upper or lower teeth, as they are with other dental consonants.

This sound and its voiced counterpart are rare phonemes, occurring in 4% of languages in a phonological analysis of 2,155 languages.  Among the more than 60 languages with over 10 million speakers, only English, northern varieties of the Berber language of North Africa, Standard Peninsular Spanish, various dialects of Arabic,  Swahili (in words derived from Arabic), and Greek have the voiceless dental non-sibilant fricative.  Speakers of languages and dialects without the sound sometimes have difficulty producing or distinguishing it from similar sounds, especially if they have had no chance to acquire it in childhood, and typically replace it with a voiceless alveolar fricative (as in Indonesian), voiceless dental stop, or a voiceless labiodental fricative; known respectively as th-alveolarization, th-stopping, and th-fronting.

The sound is known to have disappeared from a number of languages, e.g. from most of the Germanic languages or dialects, where it is retained only in Scots, English, and Icelandic, but it is alveolar in the last of these. Among non-Germanic Indo-European languages as a whole, the sound was also once much more widespread, but is today preserved in a few languages including the Brythonic languages, Peninsular Spanish, Galician, Venetian, Tuscan, Albanian, some Occitan dialects and Greek. It has likewise disappeared from many Semitic languages, such as Hebrew (excluding Yemenite Hebrew) and many modern varieties of Arabic (excluding Tunisian, Mesopotamian Arabic and various dialects in the Arabian Peninsula, as well as Modern Standard Arabic).

Features
Features of the voiceless dental non-sibilant fricative:

 It does not have the grooved tongue and directed airflow, or the high frequencies, of a sibilant.

Occurrence
{| class="wikitable"
!colspan=2| Language !! Word !! IPA !! Meaning !! Notes
|-
|colspan=2| Albanian ||  ||  || 'says' ||
|-
See Arabic phonology.
|-
|Eastern Libya ||  ||  || 'three' || 
|-
|Sanaa, Yemen ||  ||  || 'it is priced' ||
|-
|Iraq ||  ||  || 'eight' ||
|-
|Khuzestan, Iran ||   ||  || 'the second one' ||
|-
|colspan=2| Aragonese ||  ||  || 'bush' || 
|-
|colspan=2| Arapaho ||  ||  || 'five' ||
|-
|-
|colspan=2| Asturian ||  ||  || 'juice' || 
|-
|colspan=2| Avestan ||  xšaθra ||  || 'kingdom' || Ancient dead sacred language.
|-
| colspan="2" | Bashkir
| 
| 
| 'friend'
|-
|colspan=2| Berber ||  ||  || 'Berber (language)'(noun)|| This pronunciation is common in northern Morocco, central Morocco, and northern Algeria.
|-
|colspan=2| Berta ||colspan=2 align=center|  || 'to eat' ||
|-
|colspan=2| Burmese ||  / thon: ||  || 'three' || Commonly realized as an affricate .
|-
|colspan=2| Cornish ||  ||  || 'eight' ||
|-
|colspan=2| Emiliano-Romagnol || || || 'face' ||
|-
|rowspan=2|English
|Received Pronunciation
|rowspan=2 | thin
| 
|rowspan=2 | 'thin'
|
|-
|Western American
| 
| Interdental.
|-
| Galician || Most dialects ||  || || 'zero' || Merges with  into  in Western dialects. See Galician phonology
|-
|colspan=2| Greek ||  ||  || 'sea' || See Modern Greek phonology
|-
|colspan=2| Gweno ||colspan=2 align=center|  || 'eye' ||
|-
|colspan=2| Gwich’in ||  ||  || 'pants' ||
|-
|colspan=2| Halkomelem ||  ||  || 'tree' ||
|-
|colspan=2| Hän ||  ||  || 'I want' ||
|-
|colspan=2| Harsusi ||colspan=2 align=center|  || 'two' ||
|-
|rowspan=2| Hebrew || Iraqi ||rowspan=2|  ||  ||rowspan=2| 'Hebrew' (language) || rowspan="2" | See Modern Hebrew phonology
|-
| Yemenite || 
|-
| Hlai || Basadung ||colspan=2 align=center|  || 'one' ||
|-
|colspan=2| Icelandic ||  ||  || 'that' ||
|-
See Italian phonology and Tuscan gorgia
|-
|colspan=2| Kabyle ||  ||  || 'light'(noun)||
|-
| Karen || Sgaw || သၢ || || 'three' ||
|-
|colspan=2| Karuk || yiθa ||  || 'one' ||
|-
|colspan=2| Kickapoo || neθwi ||  || 'three' ||
|-
|colspan=2| Kwama ||colspan=2 align=center|  || 'to laugh' ||
|-
|colspan=2| Leonese || ceru ||  || 'zero' ||
|-
|colspan=2| Lorediakarkar ||colspan=2 align=center|  || 'four' ||
|-
|colspan=2| Malay ||  ||  || 'Tuesday' || Mostly occurs in Arabic loanwords originally containing this sound, but the writing is not distinguished from the Arabic loanwords with the  sound and this sound must be learned separately by the speakers. See Malay phonology.
|-
|colspan=2| Massa ||colspan=2 align=center|  || 'five' ||
|-
|rowspan=2| Occitan || Gascon || macipon ||  || '(male) child' || Limited the sub-dialects of the region of Castillonais, in the Ariège department.
|-
| Vivaro-Alpine || chin ||  || 'dog' || Limited to Vénosc, in the Isère department.
|-
|colspan=2| Early Old French ||  ||  || 'loved, beloved (masculine)' || Disappeared by the 12th century. Word-final allophone of /ð/; this example also alternates with feminine  .
|-
|colspan=2| Old Persian ||  XŠ / xšāyaθiya ||  || 'Shah' || Ancient extinct language.
|-
|colspan=2| Saanich || TÁŦES ||  || 'eight' ||
|-
| Sardinian || Nuorese ||  ||  || 'meat' ||
|-
|colspan=2| Shark Bay ||colspan=2 align=center|  || 'four' ||
|-
|colspan=2| Shawnee ||  ||  || 'three' ||
|-
| Sioux || Nakoda || ktusa ||  || 'four' ||
|-
| rowspan=2|Spanish || European || rowspan=1| || rowspan=1||| rowspan="1" |'to hunt' || rowspan=1|Interdental. See Spanish phonology and Seseo. This sound is not contrastive in the Americas, southern Andalusia or the Canary Islands.|-
| Castilian || rowspan=1| || rowspan=1||| rowspan="1" |'wall' || rowspan=1| Word-final, especially in Madrid. Corresponds to [ð] in standard Spanish.
|-
|colspan=2| Swahili ||  ||  || 'value' ||Mostly occurs in Arabic loanwords originally containing this sound.
|-
|colspan=2| Tanacross ||  ||  || 'embers' ||
|-
|colspan=2| Toda ||  ||  || 'nine' ||
|-
|rowspan=2| Tutchone || Northern ||  ||  ||rowspan=2| 'pants' ||
|-
| Southern ||  ||  ||
|-
|rowspan=3| Upland Yuman || Havasupai ||colspan=2 align=center|  ||rowspan=3| 'five' ||
|-
| Hualapai ||colspan=2 align=center|  ||
|-
| Yavapai ||colspan=2 align=center|  ||
|-
|-
|colspan=2| Wolaytta ||  ||  || 'flower' ||
|-
|colspan=2| Welsh ||  ||  || 'seven' ||
|-
|colspan=2| Zhuang ||  ||  || 'language' ||
|-
|Zotung
|Standard dialect of Lungngo
|kacciade||  || 'I go' 
It can also be voiced depending on the preceding consonant.
|}

Voiceless denti-alveolar sibilant

The voiceless denti-alveolar sibilant is the only sibilant fricative in some dialects of Andalusian Spanish.

 describes this sound as follows: " is a voiceless, corono-dentoalveolar groove fricative, the so-called s coronal or s plana'' because of the relatively flat shape of the tongue body....  To this writer, the coronal , heard throughout Andalusia, should be characterized by such terms as "soft," "fuzzy," or "imprecise," which, as we shall see, brings it quite close to one variety of  ...  Canfield has referred, quite correctly, in our opinion, to this  as "the lisping coronal-dental," and Amado Alonso remarks how close it is to the post-dental , suggesting a combined symbol  to represent it".

Features
Features of the voiceless denti-alveolar sibilant:

Its place of articulation is denti-alveolar, which means it is articulated with a flat tongue against the alveolar ridge and upper teeth.
It is normally laminal, which means it is pronounced with the blade of the tongue.

Occurrence

See also
 Voiced dental fricative
 Voiceless alveolar non-sibilant fricative
 Voiced dental sibilant
 Voiceless alveolar retracted sibilant
 Sibilant consonant#Possible combinations
 Pronunciation of English th
 Index of phonetics topics

Notes

References

External links
 
Discrimination of Unvoiced Fricatives using Machine Learning Methods

Dental consonants
Fricative consonants
English th
Pulmonic consonants
Voiceless oral consonants
Central consonants